The Shymkent University is higher educational institution in the city of Shymkent. The university was founded in 2001 and has 4 faculties and 2 research institutes. The university employs 289 professors, including 16 doctors of sciences, 35 candidates of sciences, senior teachers. Training is conducted in 29 undergraduate specialties and 7 magistracy specialties.

The fund of educational, methodological and scientific literature is replenished annually. The book fund of the university libraries contains electronic textbooks, teaching aids on electronic media. Contracts have been concluded with city, regional libraries and the Republican Electronic Library. The university has a modern standard building, equipped with the latest equipment for educational, laboratory and research studies. All departments of the university are provided with classrooms with interactive whiteboards, departments of language training.

Programs 

 Agronomy
 Biology
 Geography
 Foreign Philology: English
 Foreign language: two foreign languages (English)
 Computer Science
 History
 Kazakh language and literature
 Mathematics
 Fundamentals of Law and Economics
 Pedagogy and methodology of primary education
 Pedagogy and Psychology
 Soil Science and Agrochemistry
 Vocational training
 Russian language and literature
 Tourism
 Accounting and Auditing
 Physics
 5B010800: Physical culture and sports
 Finance
 Chemistry
 Economy
 Jurisprudence

References 

Universities in Kazakhstan
2001 establishments in Kazakhstan
Educational institutions established in 2001
Shymkent